Qiaowanlong (meaning "Qiaowan dragon") is a genus of sauropod dinosaur. Fossils belonging to the genus were found in 2007 from the Yujinzi Basin of Gansu, China, and were described in 2009 in the Proceedings of the Royal Society B. The remains come from a geological formation called the Xiagou Formation in the Xinminpu Group, dating to the Early Cretaceous (late Aptian stage). The only known specimen consists of articulated cervical (neck) vertebrae and a right pelvic girdle, as well as several unidentified bone fragments. Qiaowanlong was initially reported as the first brachiosaurid to have been found from China. However, later analysis found that it was more closely related to titanosauriformes like Euhelopus and Erketu. The type species is Q. kangxii.

References

Macronarians
Early Cretaceous dinosaurs of Asia
Fossil taxa described in 2009
Paleontology in Gansu
Aptian life